The Mesa County Public Library District is based in Mesa County, Colorado. The Central Library is located in Grand Junction, Colorado and the other branches are located in Clifton, Fruita, Orchard Mesa, Palisade, Collbran, and De Beque.  

MCPLD serves about 100,000 people in the Grand Valley area. They offer extensive services for children, including musical performances and puppet shows. The library also offers many services for adult learning as well as many computer-related services including classes, public computers, a digital conversion station, Wi-Fi, Black and white or color copying, scanning and printing. 

The Mesa County Public Library District also owns and operates the 970West Studio, a digital recording and production studio that offers opportunities for Mesa County residents to learn and create professional-level audio and video recordings.

External links
 

Education in Mesa County, Colorado
Public libraries in Colorado